Lazaros Papadopoulos (Greek: Λάζαρος Παπαδόπουλος; born 3 June 1980) is a Greek former professional basketball player. He was listed at 7 ft (2.13 m) 265 lbs (120 kg), and he played the center position. During his playing career, he was best known for his signature skyhook move. 

Papadopoulos played with several teams in Europe throughout his professional club career, and he most notably won the EuroLeague twice, in 2002 with Panathinaikos Athens and in 2012 with Olympiacos Piraeus. He was an All-EuroLeague Second Team selection in 2007. He represented the senior Greece national team and won the gold medal at the 2005 EuroBasket and the silver medal at the 2006 FIBA World Championship.

Professional career
Papadopoulos began his professional career playing with the Greek club Iraklis, in the 1996–97 season. After five years with Iraklis, he signed to play with the Greek League powerhouse Panathinaikos in 2001, and he stayed there until 2003. He then returned to Iraklis the following season, and stayed there for only one year, before next signing with the Russian club Dynamo Moscow, in the year 2004. In 2007, he joined the Spanish ACB League club Real Madrid. In 2008, he joined Fortitudo Bologna of the Italian League.

He won the EuroLeague championship during the EuroLeague 2001–02 season, while he was with Panathinaikos, and also the EuroCup championship, while he was with Dynamo Moscow, in the year 2006. In 2007, his performance with Dynamo Moscow during the EuroLeague 2006–07 season, earned him a selection to the All-EuroLeague Second Team.  He joined the Greek club PAOK Thessaloniki for the 2009–10 season, and donated his salary to charity.

In February 2011, he joined the Russian club Khimky Moscow Region. In August 2011, he signed a one-year deal with Olympiacos. With Olympiacos, he won the EuroLeague championship in 2012. On 5 September 2012, he returned after few seasons to his former club PAOK. On 6 February 2014, Papadopoulos wnt back to Spain, after signing with 1939 Canarias. After only one game played, he parted ways with them.

National team career

Greek junior national team
As a member in the junior Greece national team, Papadopoulos won the bronze medal at the 1998 FIBA Europe Under-18 Championship. He also competed with the Greek junior team at the 1999 FIBA Under-19 World Cup.

Greek senior national team
With the senior Greece national team, Papadopoulos won the gold medal at the 2005 EuroBasket. With Greece, he also won the silver medal at the 2006 FIBA World Championship. Papadopulos was also a member of the Greek teams that competed at the 2001 EuroBasket and the 2007 EuroBasket. He was also a part of Greece's 2004 Summer Olympic Games team. He played in a total of 103 games for Greece at the senior men's level, averaging 8.2 points per game. While playing with Greek the national team, Papadopoulos also won the Acropolis Tournament five times: in 2000, 2003, 2005, 2006, and 2007.

Personal life
Papadopoulos was born in Krasnodar, then-USSR, on 3 June 1980, as Lazar Popandopulo to a Greek father and a Russian mother. In 1990, he came to Thessaloniki, Greece with his parents, Theodore and Marina, and younger sister Agapi. 

He was married in August 2002, and he has two daughters, Daphne and Nefeli.

References

External links

 Lazaros Papadopulos' Official Website 
 NBA.com Profile
 Euroleague.net Profile
 Draftexpress.com Profile
 FIBA Archive Profile
 Greek Basket League Profile 
 Hellenic Federation Profile 

1980 births
Living people
2006 FIBA World Championship players
Basketball players at the 2004 Summer Olympics
Basketball players from Thessaloniki
BC Dynamo Moscow players
BC Khimki players
CB Canarias players
Centers (basketball)
FIBA EuroBasket-winning players
Fortitudo Pallacanestro Bologna players
Greek Basket League players
Greek expatriate basketball people in Spain
Greek men's basketball players
Greek people of Russian descent
Iraklis Thessaloniki B.C. players
Liga ACB players
Olympiacos B.C. players
Olympic basketball players of Greece
Panathinaikos B.C. players
P.A.O.K. BC players
Pontic Greeks
Real Madrid Baloncesto players
Russian people of Greek descent
Sportspeople from Krasnodar